Crown City Rockers is a five-member hip hop band from Oakland, California, by way of Boston, Massachusetts and Pasadena. Formerly known as Mission, the name under which they released their first album, they play old school hip hop music with live instrumentation (similar to other hip hop groups like: Gym Class Heroes, The Roots, N.E.R.D, and Stetsasonic). They have been compared to groups such as: A Tribe Called Quest, The Roots, and De La Soul. In 2009, the group released their third album, The Day After Forever.

Members
 Raashan Ahmad - MC
 Woodstock - samples, percussion
 Headnodic - bass guitar, production
 Max MacVeety - drums
 Kat Ouano - keyboards

Discography

Studio albums
 One (2001) 
 Earthtones (2004)
 The Day After Forever (2009)

Compilation albums
 Unreleased Joints, Demos & B-Sides (2014)

EPs
 Mission (1999) 
 Weekend Soul (2004)
 Kiss (2009)

Singles
 "Contagious" (2000) 
 "Soul Chips" b/w "Strange Days" (2001) 
 "Home" (2001) 
 "Mission: 2" (2002) 
 "Another Day (Rhyme Writing)" (2004)
 "B-Boy" b/w "Summersault" (2007)
 "Body Rock" b/w "Restless" (2008)

References

External links
 
 

American hip hop groups
Musical groups from Boston
Musical groups from Oakland, California